Quello Sallayoc (possibly from Quechua q'illu yellow, salla large cliff of gravel, -yuq a suffix to indicate ownership, "the one with a yellow cliff of gravel" or "the yellow one with a cliff of gravel") is a mountain in the Vilcanota mountain range in the Andes of Peru, about  high. It is located in the Puno Region, Carabaya Province, on the border of the districts Corani and Ollachea. Quello Sallayoc lies south-east of the mountains Llusca Ritti (Cusco-Puno), Jori Pintay and Taruca Sayana, west of the mountain Riti Huasi and northwest of the mountains Yana Sallayoc and Llusca Ritti (of Corani). Its ridge stretches to the northeast.

An intermittent stream originates south-east of Quello Sallayoc. Its waters flow to the lake Quicho Suytococha (Khichu Suytuqucha) and then to the river Lajamayu (Laq'amayu).

References

Mountains of Peru
Mountains of Puno Region